The following is a list of women who have been elected or appointed head of state or government of their respective countries since the interwar period (1918–1939). The first list includes female presidents who are heads of state and may also be heads of government, as well as female heads of government who are not concurrently head of state, such as prime ministers. The list does not include female monarchs who are heads of state (but not of government).

Khertek Anchimaa-Toka, of the mostly unrecognized and now defunct Tuvan People's Republic, is regarded as "first ever elected woman head of state in the world". She became the chairwoman of the country's presidium in 1940.

The first woman to be democratically elected as prime minister of a country was Sirimavo Bandaranaike of Ceylon (present-day Sri Lanka), when she led her party to victory in the July 1960 general election. 

The first woman to serve as president of a country was Isabel Perón of Argentina, who served as the country's vice president and succeeded to the presidency in July 1974 upon the death of her husband.

The first woman elected president of a country was Vigdís Finnbogadóttir of Iceland, who won the 1980 presidential election as well as three subsequent elections, to become the longest-serving non-hereditary female head of state in history (16 years and 0 days in office). 

The first democratically elected female prime minister of a Muslim majority country was Benazir Bhutto of Pakistan, who led her party to victory in the 1988 general election and later in 1993, making her the first democratically elected leader of any Muslim nation. Bhutto was also the first of only two non-hereditary female leaders of the world who gave birth to a child while serving in office, the other one being Jacinda Ardern of New Zealand. 

The longest serving female non-hereditary head of government and longest serving female leader of a country is Sheikh Hasina.

The prime ministers of Equatorial Guinea, Namibia, Peru, and Uganda are included in the list of elected or appointed female deputy heads of government but not in the list of elected or appointed female deputy heads of state, as they are neither heads of government, nor deputy heads of state due to the existence of the office of vice president in these countries, whereas the prime ministers of South Korea are included in both of those lists.

Currently, Barbados, and Bosnia and Herzegovina are the only republics in the world where both serving heads of state and heads of government are females.

Elected or appointed female chief executives
This list includes women who were appointed by a governing committee or parliament where heads of state or government are not directly elected by citizens. The list does not include women chosen by a hereditary monarch.

Elected or appointed acting female chief executives
This list includes women elected or appointed in an acting capacity, wherein they assumed a vacated office on a temporary basis.

Female members of collective head-of-state bodies

Female viceregal representatives

Below are women who have been appointed representatives of heads of state, such as female governors-general and French representatives of Andorra. As governors-general are appointed representatives of the monarch of the Commonwealth realms (currently Charles III) and the French Representatives of Andorra are appointed representatives of the French Co-Prince of Andorra (currently Emmanuel Macron), they act as heads of state and carry out on a regular basis the functions and duties associated with such a role in the Commonwealth realms (excluding the United Kingdom, which has no governor-general, as the monarch of the Commonwealth realms primarily resides there) and Andorra, respectively.

Acting female viceregal representatives
This list includes women appointed as viceregal representatives in an acting capacity, wherein they assumed a vacated office on a temporary basis.

See also
 List of elected or appointed female deputy heads of government
List of elected or appointed female deputy heads of state
Female president of the United States in popular culture
Council of Women World Leaders
List of current state leaders by date of assumption of office
Women in government
List of the first women heads of state and government in Muslim-majority countries
List of Muslim women heads of state and government
Muslim women political leaders
List of female hereditary rulers

Notes

References

External links
List of Current Women Heads of State
Women Heads of State
Women Presidents and Women Governors-General (Zárate's Political Collections)
Council of Women World Leaders
Female Presidents

Female heads of state
Elected and appointed heads of state and government
Lists of women politicians

sv:Lista över kvinnliga regeringschefer